A unglie ("finger") is an obsolete unit of length equal to three-fourths of an inch (1.905 cm) that was used in India and Pakistan. After metrification in both countries, the unit became obsolete.

See also
List of customary units of measurement in South Asia

References

Units of length
Customary units in India
Obsolete units of measurement